Triathlon at the 2013 Canada Summer Games was held in Sherbrooke, Quebec.  It was run from the 13 to 17 August.  There were 3 events of triathlon.

Medal table
The following is the medal table for triathlon at the 2013 Canada Summer Games.

Triathlon

References

External links 

2013 Canada Summer Games
2013 in triathlon
2013 Canada Games